The Roaring River is a tributary of the Yadkin River in northwestern North Carolina in the United States. Via the Yadkin it is part of the watershed of the Pee Dee River, which flows to the Atlantic Ocean. According to the Geographic Names Information System, it has also been known historically as "Roaring Creek." The river's name comes from its headwaters in the Blue Ridge Mountains, where it flows through a series of small waterfalls.

The Roaring River and its headwater tributaries (its East, Middle and West Prongs) all flow for their entire lengths in Wilkes County, rising in the Blue Ridge Mountains near and around Stone Mountain State Park.  Below the confluence of its principal tributaries, the Roaring River flows southeastwardly to its confluence with the Yadkin River, about 4 mi (6 km) south-southwest of Ronda. The river gives its name to the community of Roaring River, a village located at the mouth of the river.

Variant names
According to the Geographic Names Information System, it has also been known historically as:
Roaring Creek

See also 
 List of North Carolina rivers

References 

Rivers of North Carolina
Bodies of water of Wilkes County, North Carolina
Tributaries of the Pee Dee River